Čerenčany (earlier Cšerencšány), is a village and municipality in the Rimavská Sobota District of the Banská Bystrica Region of southern Slovakia. During the past several years the village recorded a growth in population, due to which new houses and condominiums were built. The village is gradually taking the name of a satellite village in Rimavská Sobota. Most important sightseeing in the village is classical evangelical church built in 1831.

Notable personalities
Samuel Kollár, writer
Miloš Krno, writer

Genealogical resources

The records for genealogical research are available at the state archive "Statny Archiv in Banska Bystrica, Slovakia"

 Roman Catholic church records (births/marriages/deaths): 1771-1896 (parish B)
 Lutheran church records (births/marriages/deaths): 1713-1896 (parish A)
 Reformated church records (births/marriages/deaths): 1771-1896 (parish B)

See also
 List of municipalities and towns in Slovakia

References

External links
 
 
http://www.statistics.sk/mosmis/eng/run.html
http://www.e-obce.sk/obec/cerencany/cerencany.html
Surnames of living people in Cerencany

Villages and municipalities in Rimavská Sobota District